Candonidae is a family of ostracods, containing around 25% of all known species of freshwater ostracods. Around 75% of genera in the family are endemic to a single zoogeographic region. It contains more than 500 species, of which more than 300 are endemic to the Palearctic realm.

Taxonomy 
The following genera are recognised in the family Candonidae:

Aglaiella 
Aglaiocypris 
Acandona
Allocypria 
Amphitritecandona 
Areacandona 
Baicalocandona 
Candobrasilopsis 
Candona 
Candonopsis 
Coralliaglaia 
Cyclocypris 
Cryptocandona 
Damonella 
Deminutiocandona 
Dolerocypria 
Electrocypria 
Eucandona 
Fabaeformiscandona 
Gerdocypris 
Ghardaglaia 
Hancockcandonopsis 
Hansacypris 
Humphreyscandona 
Indocandona 
Kempfcyclocypris 
Kencandona 
Keysercypria 
Latinopsis 
Leicacandona 
Mangalocypria 
Mazepovacandona 
Meischcandona 
Meridiescandona 
Mungava 
Myanmarcypris 
Neglecandona
Neocandona 
Notacandona 
Origocandona 
Paracandona 
Paracypria 
Paracypris 
Parapontoparta 
Phlyctenophora 
Physocypria 
Pierrecandona 
Pilbaracandona 
Pioneercandonopsis 
Pontoparta 
Pseudocandona 
Reconcavona 
Renaudcypris 
Salvadoriella 
Tasmanocypris 
Thalassocypria 
Trajancandona 
Trapezicandona 
Triangulocypris 
Typhlocypris

See also
Fabaeformiscandona aemonae, an endangered species from Slovenia
Namibcypris, an extinct genus from Namibia
Typhlocypris
Cyprididae, a family containing 50% of all freshwater ostracods

References

External links
 

 
Ostracod families